The 2007 Strauss Canada Cup of Curling was held March 13-18, 2007 at the Interior Savings Centre in Kamloops, British Columbia. The Randy Ferbey rink won their third title and Jennifer Jones won her first title on the women's side.

Men's event

Teams

Preliminary round

Tie breakers
Jordison 7-5 Koe
Gushue 7-6 Johnson

Playoffs

Women's event

Teams

Preliminary round

Playoffs

External links
cbc.ca tournament page

Canada Cup (curling)
Sport in Kamloops
2007 in Canadian curling
Curling competitions in British Columbia
2007 in British Columbia
March 2007 sports events in Canada